Konstantin Nikolaevich Nikolsky (born 1 February 1951 in Moscow) is a Russian rock musician, singer, guitarist and songwriter. He has played with a lot of Russian bands, including Voskreseniye and Tsvety.

Biography
He started back as an amateur in the late sixties with Moscow band "Atlants" with Alexander Sikorsky. He worked in official bands during the '70s, most notably a guitarist for Stas Namin band "Tsvety" and "Festival". Working for Festival he wrote songs for films.

In the summer of '81 he joined the band Voskreseniye as a songwriter and guitarist. Writing hit songs such as "O Chem Poyot Nochnaya Ptitsa" ("Of What the Night Bird Sings") and "Zerkalo Mira" ("The Mirror of the World"), the band shot to fame, and these songs became instant classics.

He only recorded one album with Voskreseniye: "Voskreseniye 2". It was recorded in a basement of an old office over three days, and is perhaps the most well known album from them.

In 1983 he left Voskreseniye and rejoined "Festival".

After finishing the Gnesini school of guitar music in '84, Nicolsky left "Festival" and formed his own musical group "Zerkalo Mira". The band disbanded three years later, shortly after taking part in the big concert "Rock Panorama", playing alongside bands like Bravo and Rondo. They did not record any albums.

After the breakup of "Zerkalo Mira", Nicolsky was joined by pianist M. Shevtsov and guitarist A. Berezovsky, and he started work on his solo project. He moved towards a calm acoustical style that fits in perfectly with his musical material. In 1990 his band was joined by bass guitarist and friend Alexander Kuzmichev and drummer Igor Kostikov.

Eventually he recorded his first solo album in 1991 and he began touring immediately afterward, playing songs from this album. The band was asked to play live on hit Russian TV shows such as "Live water", "Rock-n-roll TV" and "Program A".

The band's listeners are from a wide spectrum, the young people who can relate to Nikolsky's songs, and the older folks who know Nikolsky from his work with Voskreseniye.

Discography
 1992 — I wander off-road
 1994 — A. Romanov, K. Nikolsky. Acoustic concert (Live)
 1996 — One look back
 1998 — The best songs
 2001 — 50. Anniversary concert in the State Central Concert Hall "Russia" (Live)
 2001 — Musician. The best songs
 2002 — Starry series
 2003 — Alive string, acoustic album (Live)
 2003 — My white birds. Gold Collection
 2003 — Grand Collection
 2003 — Legends of Russian rock. Gold Collection
 2003 — Encyclopedia of Russian rock
 2004 — I only can dream of my life
 2004 — The legends of the genre. The best songs. I am myself from those 
 2004 — The Mood for Love
 2006 — Favorite songs .RU
 2007 — Illusions
 2007 — Anthology
 2009 — Soyuz Gold. Musician

External links

 Official Site
 Russmus Info on Konstantin Nicolsky, including lyrics and translations

1951 births
Russian rock guitarists
Russian male guitarists
Living people
Russian lyricists
Russian songwriters